Teddy Atine-Venel (born 16 March 1985 in Orsay, France) is a French athlete who specialises in the 400 meters. He represented his country at the 2008 Summer Olympics as well as three outdoor and one indoor World Championships.

His personal bests in the event are 45.39 seconds outdoors (Forbach 2017) and 47.38 seconds indoors (Aubière 2006).

International competitions

References 

1985 births
Living people
Sportspeople from Essonne
French male sprinters
Olympic athletes of France
Athletes (track and field) at the 2008 Summer Olympics
Athletes (track and field) at the 2016 Summer Olympics
World Athletics Championships athletes for France
Mediterranean Games silver medalists for France
Mediterranean Games medalists in athletics
Athletes (track and field) at the 2009 Mediterranean Games
Athletes (track and field) at the 2018 Mediterranean Games
21st-century French people